Cameron Coetzer (born 7 November 1995) is a South African badminton player. He competed at the 2018 Commonwealth Games in Gold Coast, Australia.

Achievements

BWF International Challenge/Series (2 titles, 2 runners-up) 
Men's singles

Men's doubles

Mixed doubles

  BWF International Challenge tournament
  BWF International Series tournament
  BWF Future Series tournament

References

External links 
 

1995 births
Living people
Sportspeople from East London, Eastern Cape
South African male badminton players
Badminton players at the 2018 Commonwealth Games
Commonwealth Games competitors for South Africa
21st-century South African people